Dave Anderson (born 14 December 1979) is a Canadian former alpine skier who competed in the 2002 Winter Olympics.

References

1979 births
Living people
Canadian male alpine skiers
Olympic alpine skiers of Canada
Alpine skiers at the 2002 Winter Olympics